Anales del Instituto de la Patagonia is an academic journal published by the University of Magallanes. It publishes articles on natural science with a focus on Earth science or biology regarding Patagonia, Tierra del Fuego, and Antarctica. 

Spanish-language journals
Academic journals published by universities of Chile
Magallanes Region
Publications established in 1970
1970 establishments in Chile
Open access journals